There are 21 routes assigned to the "E" zone of the California Route Marker Program, which designates county routes in California. The "E" zone includes county highways in Alpine, Amador, Butte, Calaveras, El Dorado, Placer, Plumas, Sacramento, Solano, Tuolumne, Yolo, and Yuba counties.

E1

County Route E1 (CR E1), known as Hot Springs Road and Montgomery Street, is a county highway in Alpine County, California, United States. It runs from Grover Hot Springs State Park to State Route 89 in Markleeville. It is the only signed county route in Alpine County.

Major intersections

E2

 County Route E2 (CR E2) is a county highway in Sacramento and Placer counties in California, United States. It is a major north–south arterial thoroughfare running from State Route 99 in Elk Grove to Interstate 80 in Roseville. The route is known as Grant Line Road, Sunrise Boulevard, Sunrise Avenue and a small portion of Douglas Boulevard.

The Grant Line Road portion of the route is part of the Capital SouthEast Connector project, a planned 34-mile expressway that will run from Interstate 5 at the Hood-Franklin Road interchange just south of Elk Grove to US 50 at the White Rock Road / Silva Valley Parkway interchange in El Dorado Hills. The CR E2 portion between SR 99 and Bradshaw Road have already been upgraded, while the portion between Bradshaw and Sunrise Boulevard remains a two-lane roadway and are in the planning stages of being upgraded.

Route description
County Route E2 begins as Grant Line Road at the interchange with State Route 99. It heads northeast on a four to six-lane roadway, reducing to a rural two-lane roadway just past Bradshaw Road, skirting the city limits of Elk Grove to the west. The route then turns north onto Sunrise Boulevard, where it remains a two-lane roadway, intersecting State Route 16 (also known as Jackson Road). CR E2 enters the city of Rancho Cordova and dramatically widens to five lanes near the intersection of Kiefer Boulevard. This stretch of roadway was widened between Kiefer Boulevard and Douglas Road to accommodate increasing traffic to the surrounding housing development. After CR E2 gains a sixth lane, the route turns northwest just after Douglas Road and then turns north again approaching White Rock Road. It approaches U.S. Route 50 at an interchange, then skirting the community of Gold River to the east. The route leaves Rancho Cordova, crossing the American River and into the community of Fair Oaks. It enters the city of Citrus Heights after Madison Avenue and is reduced to four lanes after intersecting Greenback Lane (County Route E14). It remains four lanes for the remainder of the route, entering Placer County and the city of Roseville. The route becomes Sunrise Avenue at the county line for a few miles, turning west on Douglas Boulevard and ending immediately at I-80.

Major intersections

E3

County Route E3 (CR E3) is a county highway in Placer and Sacramento counties in California, United States. It runs from U.S. Route 50 near Rancho Cordova to Interstate 80 in Rocklin. The route is known as Hazel Avenue from the US 50 interchange to the Sacramento/Placer county line and is known as Sierra College Boulevard from the Sacramento/Placer county line to the Interstate 80 interchange. Starting as a 6-lane road at US 50, it continues due north until it arrives eastward of Roseville. Then, it abruptly turns east, then runs north again until it meets I-80 in Rocklin.

Major intersections

E4

County Route E4 (CR E4) is a county highway in Yolo County, California, United States. It runs from State Route 16 in Esparto to I-5 in Dunnigan. The route is known as Road 85, Road 8, Road 86, and Road 6.

Major intersections

E5

County Route E5 (CR E5), known entirely as Rawhide Road, is a county highway in Tuolumne County, California, United States. It runs from State Route 49 and State Route 108 in Jamestown to SR 49 in Tuttletown.

Major intersections

E6

County Route E6 (CR E6) is a county highway in Yolo County, California, United States. It runs from Interstate 505 and State Route 128 near Winters to Interstate 80 in Davis. The route known as Russell Boulevard, Road 93A, Road 31, Covell Boulevard, and Mace Boulevard.

Major intersections

E7

County Route E7 (CR E7) is a county highway in Solano and Yolo counties in California, United States. It runs from Interstate 80 near Dixon to State Route 16 at the western edge of Woodland. It is known as Pedrick Road in Solano County and Road 98 in Yolo County.

Major intersections

E8

County Route E8 (CR E8) is a county highway in Yolo County, California, United States. It is a major north–south route that runs from Covell Boulevard (County Route E6) in Davis, passing through Woodland, to State Route 113 near Knights Landing. It is known as Pole Line Road and Road 102.

Major intersections

E9

County Route E9 (CR E9) is a county highway in Sacramento and Yolo counties in California, United States. It connects to State Route 160 at both ends. CR E9 runs on top of the western levee of the Sacramento River for nearly all its length, paralleling SR 160 on the eastern levee. It is known as Sutter Slough Bridge Road from its southern junction with SR 160 at the Paintersville Bridge near the town of Courtland in Sacramento County to the Yolo County line at Sutter Slough. Once in Yolo County, it is known as South River Road and passes through the town of Clarksburg before crossing over the Freeport Bridge and ending at its northern junction with SR 160 in the town of Freeport in Sacramento County.

Major intersections

E10

County Route E10 (CR E10) is a county highway in Yolo County, California, United States. It runs from Interstate 505 to State Route 113 near Knights Landing. The route is known as Road 14 and Road 13.

Major intersections

E11

County Route E11 (CR E11) is a county highway located in Yolo County, California, United States. It runs from State Route 113 near Knights Landing to State Route 45 near Tyndall Landing. The route is known as Road 99E (no relation to the former U.S. Route 99E), Road 108, and Road 98A. A portion of the route is unpaved gravel.

Major intersections

E12

County Route E12 (CR E12), known entirely as Elk Grove Boulevard, is a county highway in Sacramento County, California, United States. It runs from Franklin Boulevard (County Route J8) to Grant Line Road (County Route E2) in Elk Grove. Elk Grove Boulevard is a major east–west arterial in Elk Grove from Interstate 5 to Elk Grove Florin Road (the county route designation ends at Franklin Boulevard); east of this intersection, the road narrows to two lanes and proceeds east through the historical "Old Town" section of Elk Grove. The road continues east until its terminus with Grant Line Road (CR E2).

Major intersections

E13

County Route E13 (CR E13) is a county highway in Sacramento County, California, United States. It runs from River Road (County Route J11) and the Walnut Grove Bridge in Walnut Grove to State Route 99 and State Route 104 in Galt. The route is known as River Road and Twin Cities Road.

Route description
County Route E13 begins at its junction with CR J11 at the eastern terminus of the Walnut Grove Bridge in Walnut Grove and proceeds north on top of the eastern levee of the Sacramento River, along River Road, passing the small town of Locke.  At the intersection of River Road and Twin Cities Road, CR E13 turns east and follows Twin Cities Road.  The route reaches its junction with I-5 and County Route J8 north of the town of Thornton, and continues east until its junction with SR 99 and SR 104 in Galt.

River Road is on the California Scenic Highway System.

Major intersections

E14

County Route E14 (CR E14) is a county highway in Sacramento County, California, United States. It runs from State Route 99 in Sacramento to Hazel Avenue (County Route E3) in Orangevale. Known as Elkhorn Boulevard and Greenback Lane, it is a major east–west arterial thoroughfare that connects the cities and communities of Sacramento, Rio Linda, North Highlands, Foothill Farms, Citrus Heights, and Orangevale.

Route description
County Route E14 begins on Elkhorn Boulevard at the interchange with State Route 99 north of Sacramento. It starts out as a two-lane roadway, skirting the northern end of the North Natomas development of Sacramento. As it enters the rural community of Rio Linda, the roadway expands to four lanes and remains at least four lanes throughout the remainder of the route. The landscape changes from rural to suburb as it passes through North Highlands and Foothill Farms, where the roadway expands to six lanes at Don Julio Boulevard. As it reaches the interchange with Interstate 80, the route becomes Greenback Lane. As it exits Citrus Heights and into the community of Fair Oaks, the roadway is reduced to four lanes as it reaches its terminus at Hazel Avenue (County Route E3) in Orangevale. The roadway itself continues as Greenback Lane towards the city of Folsom.

The name "greenback" refers to the use of paper money for financial transactions at a time when gold and silver coin was the preferred rate of exchange.  The property that Greenback Lane lies on was bought with greenback dollars (United States Note).  The owner is said to have wished to be paid with coin, and became angered when he was not, hence the name "Greenback Lane."

Construction to expand Greenback Lane between Dewey Drive/Van Maren Lane and Auburn Boulevard in Citrus Heights from four to six lanes was completed in 2008, creating an entirely six lane thoroughfare within the city of Citrus Heights.

Major intersections

E15

County Route E15 (CR E15) is a county highway in Calaveras County, California, United States. It runs from State Route 120 in Yosemite Junction to State Route 4 in Copperopolis. The route is known as O'Byrnes Ferry Road for most of the route and Main Street in Copperopolis.

Major intersections

E16

County Route E16 (CR E16) is a county highway in Amador and El Dorado counties in California, United States. It runs from State Route 49 in Plymouth to U.S. Route 50 in Pollock Pines. The route is known as Shenandoah Road, Mount Aukum Road, and Sly Park Road. A portion of the route (along with Mormon Emigrant Trail, State Route 88, and State Route 89) was an alternate route of US 50 when the highway was closed due to mudslides or rockslides from inclement weather.

Major intersections

E17

County Route E17 (CR E17) is a county highway in Tuolumne County, California, United States. It runs from Mono Way (old State Route 108) near Sonora to SR 108 near Twain Harte. The route is known as Tuolumne Road and Tuolumne Road North.

Major intersections

E18

County Route E18 (CR E18), known entirely as Parrotts Ferry Road, is a county highway in Calaveras and Tuolumne counties in California, United States. It runs from State Route 49 north of Sonora, passing through the community of Columbia, to State Route 4 in Vallecito.

Major intersections

E19

County Route E19 (CR E19), known entirely as Clarksburg Road, is a county highway in Yolo County, California, United States. It runs from Jefferson Boulevard (State Route 84) to South River Road (CR E9) in Clarksburg.

Major intersections

E20

County Route E20 (CR E20), known entirely as Marysville Road, is a county highway in Yuba County, California, United States. It runs from Willow Glen Road (County Route E21) to State Route 49 near Camptonville.

Major intersections

E21

County Route E21 (CR E21) is a county highway in Butte, Plumas, and Yuba counties in California, United States. It runs from State Route 20 in Browns Valley to Warren Hill Road in La Porte. The route is known as Marysville Road, Willow Glen Road, La Porte Road, Quincy La Porte Road, and Main Street in La Porte.

Major intersections

See also

References

E*